North Dakota Highway 65 (ND 65) is a  east–west state highway in the U.S. state of North Dakota. ND 65's western terminus is at ND 1 east of Binford, and the eastern terminus is at ND 45 north of Cooperstown.

Major intersections

References

065
Transportation in Griggs County, North Dakota